Mary Morgan Gibbs (born October 5, 1996) is an American voice actress. She is known for voicing the human toddler Boo in the Pixar animated film Monsters, Inc..

Life and career 
Mary Gibbs was born in Pasadena, California, to Pixar animator and director Rob Gibbs (1964–2020). 

Having been a toddler at the time she was recorded as the voice of Boo in Monsters, Inc., audio crew found it difficult to record her lines because she would run all over the Pixar office. When Pixar's Inside Out (2015) was in production, the audio recordings of Gibbs's screams as Boo were reused for baby Riley. One of the production babies listed in the film credits of Toy Story 2 (1999) is Mary. Rob Gibbs, her father, was the story artist for that film. As a teenager, Gibbs suffered from scoliosis before she had surgery in 2012 to fix it.
 Gibbs returned to acting in 2022, voicing the character of Janessa Jensen in the audio-drama series Heroes of Extinction for Adventurous Ideas, LLC. In January 2022, Gibbs spoke on a panel at the Bakersfield Mouse-Con event about the project alongside other actors and producers of the series: Jason Braden, Isaac C. Singleton Jr., Jerry Cornell, C. Andrew Nelson, and Joshua C. Shaffer.

Gibbs has been documenting her life and time as Boo on her YouTube channel, Boo Grown Up.

Filmography

Film

Video games

Radio

References

External links 
 
 Mary Gibbs's YouTube Channel
 Adventurous Ideas, LLC

1996 births
American child actresses
Living people